Tupan may refer to:
 Tǔpan, a double-headed drum
 Tupã (mythology), the thunder god of the Tupi and Guaraní people of Brazil
 Tupan, Nikšić, Montenegro
 Tupan Patera, a volcano on Io